Banu Zuhrah is a clan of the Quraysh tribe.

Akhnas ibn Shariq al-Thaqifi and the Banu Zuhrah were with the Meccan as part of the escort that preceded the battle of Badr, but since he believed the caravan to be safe, he did not join Quraish on their way to a festival in Badr. He together with Banu Zuhrah returned, so this two clans present in the battle 

 writes:

Notable Members
Sa`d ibn Abi Waqqas, an early convert to Islam and one of the important companions of the Muhammad.
Aminah bint Wahb, mother of the Islamic prophet Muhammad.
Wahb ibn 'Abd Manaf, grandfather of Muhammad.
Abd-al-Rahman ibn Awf, a companion of the Islamic prophet Muhammad.
Muhammad ibn Abi Bakr al-Zuhri, a 12th-century Andalusian geographer.
Ibn Shihab al-Zuhri, an 8th-century biographer of the Islamic prophet Muhammad.

References

 
Arab groups